Heliamphora minor (Latin: minor = smaller) is a species of marsh pitcher plant endemic to Auyán-tepui in Venezuela. As the name suggests, it is one of the smallest species in the genus.  It is closely related to H. ciliata and H. pulchella.

Cultivation 

Heliamphora minor is one of the more widely available species in the genus for cultivation. Typically, H. minor is grown under strong fluorescent lights in a terrarium, or in a greenhouse with partial sunlight. Like other carnivorous plants, H. minor requires water free from added minerals and chemicals. It can survive a wide range of temperatures, preferably around 70–90 °F, however during the night the temperature must drop to around 10 degrees less than the day temperature.
Soil for H. minor must be low in nutrients. Combinations of washed sand, orchid bark, long fibered sphagnum moss (dried or living), peat moss, and perlite may be used.
Heliamphora plants also require a high humidity level (70+%), which can be achieved in a greenhouse or terrarium.

Infraspecific taxa
Two varieties of H. minor are recognised: the autonym H. minor var. minor and H. minor var. pilosa, which is characterised by conspicuous hairs on the pitcher exterior. The purpose of the exterior indumentum is unknown, but may assist in the scaling of otherwise glabrous exterior surfaces. Another hypothesis suggests that it may discourage terrestrial arthropods from scaling the pitcher and restrict access to the nectar spoon to flying insects, thus preventing the loss of nectar to insects that tend to steal nectar. Also, the highly reflective surface of the indumenta may make foliage more visible to flying insects with light-sensitive vision. 

Distinguishing factors between H. pulchella and H. minor include nectar spoon morphology; the nectar spoons of pulchella emerge directly on the back rim of the pitcher in a small depression, while the spoon of minor emerges on a narrow stalk ending in a larger nectar spoon than that of pulchella.

Heliamphora minor f. laevis, described by Julian Alfred Steyermark in 1984, is considered a synonym of H. minor var. minor.

References

Further reading

 Jaffé, K., M.S. Blum, H.M. Fales, R.T. Mason & A. Cabrera (1995). On insect attractants from pitcher plants of the genus Heliamphora (Sarraceniaceae). Journal of Chemical Ecology 21(3): 379–384.  
 McPherson, S. 2007. Pitcher Plants of the Americas. The McDonald & Woodward Publishing Company, Blacksburg, Virginia.
 Nerz, J. & A. Wistuba (June 2000). Heliamphora hispida (Sarraceniaceae), a new species from Cerro Neblina, Brazil-Venezuela. Carnivorous Plant Newsletter 29(2): 37–41.
 Nerz, J. (December 2004). Heliamphora elongata (Sarraceniaceae), a new species from Ilu-Tepui. Carnivorous Plant Newsletter 33(4): 111–116.
 Nerz, J. & A. Wistuba (June 2006). Heliamphora exappendiculata, a clearly distinct species with unique characteristics. Carnivorous Plant Newsletter 35(2): 43–51.
 Steyermark, J.A. et al. (May 18, 1951). Sarraceniaceae. [pp. 239–242] In: Contributions to the flora of Venezuela. Botanical exploration in Venezuela – 1. Fieldiana: Botany 28(1): 1–242.
 Taylor, M.S. (1989). Plant taxa described by Julian A. Steyermark. Annals of the Missouri Botanical Garden 76(3): 652–780.  
 Wistuba, A., P. Harbarth & T. Carow (December 2001). Heliamphora folliculata, a new species of Heliamphora (Sarraceniaceae) from the ‘Los Testigos’ table mountains in the south of Venezuela. Carnivorous Plant Newsletter 30(4): 120–125.
 Wistuba, A., T. Carow & P. Harbarth (September 2002). Heliamphora chimantensis, a new species of Heliamphora (Sarraceniaceae) from the ‘Macizo de Chimanta’ in the south of Venezuela. Carnivorous Plant Newsletter 31(3): 78–82.
  Wistuba, A., T. Carow, P. Harbarth, & J. Nerz (2005). Heliamphora pulchella, eine neue mit Heliamphora minor (Sarraceniaceae) verwandte Art aus der Chimanta Region in Venezuela. Das Taublatt 53(3): 42–50.
 Journal of Venezuela Expedition January/February 2006 by D. Bruce Means. Journals: D. Bruce Means, PhD. 

minor
Endemic flora of Venezuela
Plants described in 1939
Flora of the Tepuis